Marco Pérez may refer to:
 Marco Angel Pérez (born 1977), Mexican boxer
 Marco Pérez (actor) (born 1977), Mexican actor
 Marco Pérez (Liechtenstein footballer) (born 1978), Liechtenstein footballer for Wiener Sport-Club
 Marco Iván Pérez (born 1987), Mexican footballer for C.F. Pachuca
 Marco Pérez (Colombian footballer) (born 1990), Colombian footballer for Independiente Medellín